AEPS may refer to :

Arctic Environmental Protection Strategy
Advanced Electric Propulsion System, Hall Effect thruster by Aerojet Rocketdyne for NASA.
Aadhaar Enabled Payment System, used in India
Alternative Energy Portfolio Standards Act of 2004, USA